Eira Hospital is a private hospital in southern part of Helsinki, Finland. It has given its name to the adjacent Eira district of Helsinki.

The architectural landmark is located at Tehtaankatu and Laivurinkatu cross, with address at Tehtaankatu 30 in Helsinki. The building was designed by Lars Sonck and its construction was completed in June 1905. It is named Eira after similar Eira-named hospital in Stockholm. In Icelandic Poetic Edda Eir was the art-of-medicine goddess.

References

External links
 
 Eira Hospital 

Hospital buildings completed in 1905
Hospitals established in 1905
Hospitals in Helsinki
Ullanlinna
Lars Sonck buildings
National Romantic architecture in Finland
Art Nouveau architecture in Helsinki
Art Nouveau hospital buildings
1905 establishments in Finland